"Another place" or "the other place" is a euphemism used in many bicameral parliaments using the Westminster system, including Australia, Canada and the United Kingdom.

A member of one house will not usually refer directly to the other, but refer to it indirectly using the phrase "another place" or "the other place". So, for example, a member of the Senate of Canada would not mention "the House of Commons" but would use the phrase "the other place".

The tradition does not extend to business conducted outside the house (such as speeches and interviews), and is generally dropped when a debate is directly addressing the nature of the other house, such as in debates on reform of the House of Lords in the Parliament of the United Kingdom.

The reasons for the tradition are unclear, but it has been suggested that it dates back to a period of ill-feeling between the two houses of the UK Parliament. Similarly a member talking of their own house would refer to it as "this place".

College rivalries
Similarly, the universities of Oxford and Cambridge refer to each other as "the other place", as do the pupils of the British public schools Eton and Harrow.

References

External links
 BBC Guide to Parliament

Westminster system
Euphemisms
Canadian political phrases
British political phrases